Eva Calvo (29 November 1921 - 7 December 2001) was a  Mexican actress. She appeared in more than forty films from 1944 to 2001.

Selected filmography

References

External links 

1921 births
2001 deaths
Mexican film actresses